Beorhthelm (also Bertelin, Bertram and Bettelin) is an Anglo-Saxon saint about whom the only evidence is legendary.  He is said to have had a hermitage on the island of Bethnei, which later became the town of Stafford. Later he went to a more hilly area, possibly near Ilam, where he died. Beorhthelm (Bertram) of Stafford is venerated as a saint in the Eastern Orthodox Church and Catholic Church, with a feast day on 10 August.

Hagiography
According to an account from the 14th century, Bertram was said to have lived some time in the 8th century. The son of a Mercian king, he was a friend and pupil of Saint Guthlac.  After Guthlac's death around 715, Beorthelm established a hermitage on the peninsula named Betheney. He is said to have converted many to Christianity, and reputedly was able to work miraculous cures through his prayers. The ill-will of jealous detractors, led him to relocate to Ilam, in Dovedale, Derbyshire, where he eventually died.

Veneration
His shrine is in the Church of the Holy Cross, Ilam, and became a point of pilgrimage in the Middle Ages,

He is the patron saint of Stafford. There are some remains of the medieval shrine of St Beorhthelm near the west end of St Mary's Collegiate Church in Stafford.

The priory of Augustinian canons founded in 1115 on the south bank of the River Mersey at Runcorn, Cheshire, initially dedicated to Beorhthelm, was adopted from the dedication to him of a Saxon church already existing on the site. This priory was the predecessor of Norton Priory.

In Barthomley, now in Cheshire, there stands the only church dedicated to the saint, St Bertoline's Church, Barthomley.

Sources
 Bowkett, L.C. (1986) The Stafford Hinterland – An archaeological review from the Roman Invasion to circa 850 AD

References

Mercian saints